Andelaroche is a commune in the Allier department in the Auvergne-Rhône-Alpes region of central France.

The inhabitants of the commune are known as Andelarochois or Andelarochoises.

Geography
The D990/D994 road passes through the west of the commune from south-west to north-east. Access to the village is by the minor D424 road from Barrais-Bussolles in the north through the commune and the village then continuing south-east to Saint-Martin-d'Estreaux. The minor D470 road also goes from the village south-west to Droiturier. The commune is mostly farmland with a large forest in the south-east, the Bois de Saint Pierre in the centre, and a few isolated patches of forest towards the north.

The Andan river forms the south-western border of the commune, the Ruisseau de Maupes forms the north-western border, and the Ruisseau de l'Etang Civette forms part of the eastern border. Numerous other streams criss-cross the commune with many small lakes.

Neighbouring communes and villages

Administration

List of Successive Mayors

Population

Sites and monuments

There is a church of Romanesque origin but much altered in the 19th century. It is now a composite structure that has lost its original appearance.

Andelaroche Picture Gallery

See also
Communes of the Allier department

References

External links
Andelaroche on the National Geographic Institute website 
Andelaroche on Géoportail, National Geographic Institute (IGN) website 
Ande la Roche on the 1750 Cassini Map

Communes of Allier
Bourbonnais